Sternwarte Uecht is an observatory on Längenberg at Niedermuhlern, Canton of Berne, Switzerland.

External links 
 Sternwarte Uecht 

Uecht
Buildings and structures in the canton of Bern